The Gorsett Farmstead is a historic house in Volin, South Dakota. It was built in 1912, and designed in the Neocolonial and Queen Anne architectural styles. It has been listed on the National Register of Historic Places since April 16, 1980.

References

National Register of Historic Places in Yankton County, South Dakota
Queen Anne architecture in South Dakota
Colonial Revival architecture in South Dakota
Houses completed in 1912